James Turner (20 February 1898–1973) was an English footballer who played in the Football League for Rotherham County and Rotherham United.

References

1898 births
1973 deaths
English footballers
Association football defenders
English Football League players
Rotherham County F.C. players
Rotherham United F.C. players